Viximo, located in Cambridge, Massachusetts, makes software for virtual currency used in social networking, online dating and casual gaming sites. The software includes payment systems, virtual goods, and white-label apps and games.

History

Viximo was founded in October 2008 by Brian Balfour and Sean Lindsay. In April 2009, the company secured US $5 million in a round of funding from North Bridge Venture Partners and Sigma Partners. In January 2010, Viximo appointed Dale Strang as Chief Executive Officer. In July 2012, the company received an investment from Michael Pope and Adam Levin. Michael Pope was appointed President in July 2012, with Shamoon Siddiqui being appointed interim CTO.

In October 2015, Viximo announced the sale of the company to Pocket Games, Inc. (OTC PINK: PKGM).

In October 2009, Viximo announced its partnership with Zorpia.com, an international social network with 16 million worldwide users.

In November 2009, Viximo added music company Interscope Geffen A&M, a division of Universal Music Group, to its portfolio of clients and powered Lady Gaga's Gift Shop on Facebook.

In January 2010, Viximo was one of 11 Boston start-ups honored as winners of the 2010 OnMedia 100 Top Private Companies Award.

In late July 2012, Viximo was acquired by Social Technology Holdings, Inc.

Business model

Viximo is supported by revenue sharing agreements with social networking, online dating and casual gaming sites. Viximo provides these online publishers with the technology needed to run a virtual goods economy which can help them monetize user activities and increase user engagement. The technology includes virtual currency, payment systems, user analytics and white-label apps and games in which users can spend virtual currency. Viximo also works with content creators such as artists, brands, sports teams, athletes and celebrities to distribute and monetize branded content.

Viximo's publisher network reaches over 60 million monthly users. As of 2010, their clients included:

Bebo
BlackPlanet
Quepasa
Friendster
Gaia Online
Multiply
StudiVZ
Tuenti

Notes

External links
Official Viximo website

Virtual economies
Software companies based in Massachusetts
Online companies of the United States
Defunct software companies of the United States